Dong Yuping (born 1 March 1963) is a retired Chinese athlete. She competed in the women's heptathlon at the 1988 Summer Olympics.

References

1963 births
Living people
Athletes (track and field) at the 1988 Summer Olympics
Chinese heptathletes
Olympic athletes of China
Place of birth missing (living people)
Asian Games medalists in athletics (track and field)
Asian Games silver medalists for China
Athletes (track and field) at the 1990 Asian Games
Medalists at the 1990 Asian Games